Raduga (:'rainbow') can refer to :

 MKB Raduga, a Russian maker of missile systems formerly known as OKB Raduga
 VBK-Raduga, an unmanned reentry capsule used to return material from the Russian Mir space station
 Raduga (satellite), a series of Russian communications satellites
 Raduga Publishers, a publishing house of the Soviet Union
 Rainbow (1944 film), a 1944 film directed by Mark Donskoy
 Raduga (radio), a Russian-language music radio station in Lithuania
 Raduga (nuclear test) a Soviet nuclear test